Francisco González Suaste (born c.1917) was a Mexican hammer thrower who competed in the 1948 Summer Olympics.

References

External links
 

Year of birth missing
Possibly living people
Mexican male hammer throwers
Olympic athletes of Mexico
Athletes (track and field) at the 1948 Summer Olympics
Central American and Caribbean Games gold medalists for Mexico
Central American and Caribbean Games silver medalists for Mexico
Competitors at the 1938 Central American and Caribbean Games
Competitors at the 1946 Central American and Caribbean Games
Central American and Caribbean Games medalists in athletics
20th-century Mexican people